Jeff Eckerle is an American television producer and writer.  He is a graduate of the University of Wisconsin (BA) and the UCLA Anderson School of Management (MBA), and worked as a development and programming executive for Fox (FBC), CBS Productions and Wolf Films before segueing into writing and producing full-time.  Credits include Supervising Producer/Writer on Law & Order: Special Victims Unit, Tower Prep, Unnatural History and Those Who Kill starring Chloe Sevigny and James D'Arcy for A&E Network.  He is partnered with fellow writer/producer Marilyn Osborn.

References

External links

American television producers
American television writers
American male television writers
Living people
Place of birth missing (living people)
Year of birth missing (living people)